Willie Lee Campbell Glass (August 24, 1910 – May 2, 1999) was an African-American academic.

Early life and education
Glass was born on 24 August 1910 in Nacogdoches, Texas. Her father, Edward John Campbell, was a principal of a segregated school in Nacogdoches. She was educated at Prairie View A & M College.

Career
During her career, Glass headed Texas Education Agency. She was a co-founder of Top Teens of America.

Recognition
 Texas Women's Hall of Fame
 Willie Lee Glass Community Development Services Center at Texas College, Tyler is named after her
 "In Memory of Willie Lee Campbell Glass," Senate Resolution No. 890, May 7, 1999

Further reading
 A Psalm of Life: The Story of a Woman Whose Life Made a Difference, Willie Lee Campbell Glass (1998) by Patsy Spurrier Hallman

References

American educators
Texas Education Agency